Crawford County is a county in the Commonwealth of Pennsylvania. As of the 2020 census, the population was 83,938. Its county seat is Meadville. The county was created on March 12, 1800, from part of Allegheny County and named for Colonel William Crawford.

Crawford County comprises the Meadville, PA Micropolitan Statistical Area, which is also included in the Erie-Meadville, PA Combined Statistical Area.

Geography
It has a warm-summer humid continental climate (Dfb) and average monthly temperatures in Meadville range from 24.9 °F in January to 69.5 °F in July, while in Titusville they range from 24.2 °F in January to 68.8 °F in July.

Adjacent counties
Erie County (north)
Warren County (east)
Venango County (southeast)
Mercer County (south)
Trumbull County, Ohio (southwest)
Ashtabula County, Ohio (west)

National protected area
Erie National Wildlife Refuge

State protected area
Pymatuning State Park is on Pymatuning Reservoir.

Major highways

Demographics

As of the 2000 census, there were 90,366 people, 34,678 households, and 23,858 families residing in the county.  The population density was 89 people per square mile (34/km2).  There were 42,416 housing units at an average density of 42 per square mile (16/km2).  The racial makeup of the county was 97.00% White, 1.59% Black or African American, 0.20% Native American, 0.28% Asian, 0.03% Pacific Islander, 0.13% from other races, and 0.77% from two or more races.  0.59% of the population were Hispanic or Latino of any race. 45.1% English or Welsh, 10.9% American, 10.3% were of German, 8.2% Irish, 7.8% Scotch-Irish or Scottish, 3.8% Italian 2.6% Dutch, and 2.3% French ancestry.

There were 34,678 households, out of which 30.40% had children under the age of 18 living with them, 55.60% were married couples living together, 9.20% had a female householder with no husband present, and 31.20% were non-families. 26.20% of all households were made up of individuals, and 11.60% had someone living alone who was 65 years of age or older.  The average household size was 2.50 and the average family size was 3.01.

In the county, the population was spread out, with 24.70% under the age of 18, 9.20% from 18 to 24, 26.60% from 25 to 44, 23.90% from 45 to 64, and 15.60% who were 65 years of age or older.  The median age was 38 years. For every 100 females, there were 94.80 males.  For every 100 females age 18 and over, there were 90.80 males.

2020 Census

Micropolitan Statistical Area
The United States Office of Management and Budget has designated Crawford County as the Meadville, PA Micropolitan Statistical Area (µSA).  As of the 2010 census the micropolitan area ranked 5th most populous in the State of Pennsylvania and the 52nd most populous in the United States with a population of 88,765.  Crawford County is also a part of the Erie-Meadville, PA Combined Statistical Area (CSA), which combines the population of both Crawford County and the Erie County areas.  The Combined Statistical Area ranked 7th in the State of Pennsylvania and 102nd most populous in the United States with a population of 369,331.

Government

|}

As of February 21, 2022, there were 52,493 registered voters in Crawford County.

 Democratic: 16,427 (31.29%)
 Republican: 29,575 (56.34%)
 Independent: 4,333 (8.25%)
 Third Party: 2,158 (4.11%)

County Commissioners
Eric Henry - Chairman (R)
Francis Weiderspahn Jr - Vice Chairman (R)
J. Christopher Soff - Secretary/Treasurer (D)

Other county officials
John F. Spataro, President Judge of the Court of Common Pleas
Mark Stevens, Judge of the Court of Common Pleas
Vacant, Judge of the Court of Common Pleas
Diana Perry (R), Auditor
Kathleen Roae (R), Auditor
Christopher Seeley (D), Auditor
Patricia Wetherbee (R), Clerk of Courts
Scott Schell (R), Coroner
Francis Schultz (R), District Attorney
Emmy Arnett (R), Prothonotary
Beth Forbes (R), Register of Wills/Recorder of Deeds
David L. Powers (R), Sheriff
Christine Krzysiak (R), Treasurer

Pennsylvania Senate

Pennsylvania House of Representatives

United States House of Representatives

United States Senate

Education

Colleges and universities
Allegheny College, located in Meadville
University of Pittsburgh at Titusville, a branch campus of the University of Pittsburgh, located in Titusville

Community, junior and technical colleges
Precision Manufacturing Institute (PMI)
Laurel Technical Institute (LTI)

Public school districts
 Conneaut School District
 Corry Area School District
 Crawford Central School District
 Jamestown Area School District
 Penncrest School District
 Titusville Area School District
 Union City Area School District

Communities

Under Pennsylvania law, there are four types of incorporated municipalities: cities, boroughs, townships, and, in at most two cases, towns. The following cities, boroughs, and townships are located in Crawford County:

Cities
Meadville (county seat)
Titusville

Boroughs

Blooming Valley
Cambridge Springs
Centerville
Cochranton
Conneaut Lake
Conneautville
Hydetown
Linesville
Saegertown
Spartansburg
Springboro
Townville
Venango
Woodcock

Townships

Athens
Beaver
Bloomfield
Cambridge
Conneaut
Cussewago
East Fairfield
East Fallowfield
East Mead
Fairfield
Greenwood
Hayfield
North Shenango
Oil Creek
Pine
Randolph
Richmond
Rockdale
Rome
Sadsbury
South Shenango
Sparta
Spring
Steuben
Summerhill
Summit
Troy
Union
Venango
Vernon
Wayne
West Fallowfield
West Mead
West Shenango
Woodcock

Census-designated places
Census-designated places are geographical areas designated by the U.S. Census Bureau for the purposes of compiling demographic data. They are not actual jurisdictions under Pennsylvania law.

Adamsville
Atlantic
Canadohta Lake
Conneaut Lakeshore
Fredericksburg
Geneva
Guys Mills
Harmonsburg
Hartstown
Kerrtown
Lincolnville
Pymatuning Central
Pymatuning North
Pymatuning South
Riceville

Unincorporated communities
 Buells Corners
 Custards
 Frenchtown

Population ranking
The population ranking of the following table is based on the 2010 census of Crawford County.

† county seat

Distinguished residents
 The abolitionist John Brown lived in Crawford County for 11 years, more than he lived anywhere else.  He was the first postmaster of Randolph Township, a position he held from 1828 to 1836, and he carried the mail from Meadville. In 1825 he started the county's first industry, a tannery, today the John Brown Farm, Tannery & Museum. In his barn, an Underground Railroad station, he had a secret, well-ventilated room in which to hide fugitive slaves. One reason he relocated to Crawford County, he said, was that it was a good location for helping them.
 Robert F. Kent (1911–1982) was born in Meadville and represented Crawford County in the Pennsylvania House of Representatives from 1947 to 1956. He was elected  Pennsylvania State Treasurer in 1956 and held this office from January 1957 to January 1961.

See also
 National Register of Historic Places listings in Crawford County, Pennsylvania

References

External links

Crawford County Official Website
Crawford County Website archived as of 2013
Crawford County Historical Society
History of Townships in Crawford County, PA 
Crawford County's Historic Bridges
Crawford County Convention and Visitors Bureau

 
1800 establishments in Pennsylvania
Populated places established in 1800
Counties of Appalachia